Igor Klipii (born January 13, 1968 in Fundurii Vechi) is a Moldovan politician and diplomat.

Biography 
He studied law and history at the "Ion Creangă" State University in Chişinău and international relations at the National School of Administration and Political Science of Bucharest (Romania) and the European Institute of High International Studies in Nice (France). In 2005 – 2009 he served as member of the Parliament of Moldova. Between 2008 and 2010 he was Deputy Chairman of Democratic Party of Moldova.

In June 2010 Igor Klipii was designated Ambassador of Moldova in Lithuania.

External links 
 Parlamentul Republicii Moldova
  List of candidates to the position of deputy in the Parliament of the Republic of Moldova for parliamentary elections of March 6, 2005 of the Electoral Bloc “Moldova Democrata”
 List of deputies elected in the March 6 parliamentary elections
 Lista deputaţilor aleşi la 6 martie 2005 în Parlamentul Republicii Moldova
 Igor Klipii va fi ambasadorul Republicii Moldova in Lituania

References

1968 births
Living people
Moldovan MPs 2005–2009
Electoral Bloc Democratic Moldova MPs
Democratic Party of Moldova politicians
Ambassadors of Moldova to Lithuania